Victor Kunene (born 19 December 1966) is a South African boxer. He competed in the men's light middleweight event at the 1996 Summer Olympics.

References

1966 births
Living people
People from Newcastle, KwaZulu-Natal
Zulu people
Sportspeople from KwaZulu-Natal
South African male boxers
Olympic boxers of South Africa
Boxers at the 1996 Summer Olympics
Light-middleweight boxers